Robert Burnham Renwick, 1st Baron Renwick, KBE (4 October 1904 – 30 August 1973), known as Sir Robert Renwick, 2nd Baronet, from 1932 to 1964, was a British industrialist and public servant.

Renwick was the only son of Sir Harry Renwick, 1st Baronet, and his wife Frederica Louisa (née Laing). His father was head of County of London Electric Supply Ltd., the electric power utility for London. Robert succeeded in the baronetcy in 1932, and became head of County of London Electric in 1939.

During the Second World War he held several important offices. He was Controller of Communications at the Air Ministry and of Communications Equipment at the Ministry of Aircraft Production from 1942 to 1945. He also served as Chairman of the Airborne Forces Committee from 1943 to 1945. In 1947 the Labour Government nationalized Renwick's power companies under the Electricity Act 1947.

Renwick turned his attention to broadcasting. He was extremely influential in commercial television in the United Kingdom, and saw a good return from his television interests. He was chairperson of British Wireless and Television. On 23 December 1964 he was raised to the peerage as Baron Renwick, of Coombe in the County of Surrey.

Family

Lord Renwick married, firstly, Dorothy Mary, daughter of Harold Parkes, in 1929. They were divorced in 1953. 

He married, secondly, Joan, daughter of Sir Reginald Clarke and widow of John Ogilvie Spencer, in 1953. 

He died in August 1973, aged 68, and was succeeded in his titles by his only son from his first marriage, Harry. His daughter Jennifer was the first wife of oarsman and printer Antony Rowe.

Arms

Notes

References
 Kidd, Charles, Williamson, David (editors). Debrett's Peerage and Baronetage (1990 edition). New York: St Martin's Press, 1990.
 Burke’s Peerage, established in London in 1826 by John Burke and has become the definitive guide to the genealogy and heraldry of the Peerage, Baronetage, Knightage and Landed Gentry of the United Kingdom and many other countries associated with the UK historically.
 

1904 births
1973 deaths
Knights Commander of the Order of the British Empire
Place of birth missing
Place of death missing
20th-century British businesspeople
Hereditary barons created by Elizabeth II
Civil servants in the Ministry of Aircraft Production
Baronets in the Baronetage of the United Kingdom